Serravalle a Po is a comune (municipality) in the Province of Mantua in the Italian region Lombardy, located about  east of Milan and about  east of Mantua.

Serravalle a Po borders the following municipalities: Gazzo Veronese, Ostiglia, Borgo Mantovano, Quingentole,  Sustinente.

References

External links
 Official website

Cities and towns in Lombardy